Ganesa Macula is a dark feature on Saturn's moon Titan. It is named after the Hindu god Ganesha.

Ganesa was formerly tentatively identified as a cryovolcanic dome: the result of a mixture of water and ammonia erupting from the center of the dome and spreading out to form a pancake-like deposit. However, topographical data have since shown that it is not dome-shaped, and as a result, there is no longer any evidence that it is of volcanic origin.

References

Surface features of Titan (moon)